Ann Simons (born 5 August 1980) is a judoka from Belgium.

Career
Born in Tongeren, Simons was an 8 time Belgian champion in the category -48 kg. In 2001 and 2003 she also won the bronze medal at the European championships. In 2000, she won the bronze medal in the European Championship for teams. The high point of her career was winning the Bronze Medal in the -48 kg category at the 2000 Summer Olympics in Sydney.

Simons had to retire from the judo sport in 2006 due to a persistent knee injury.

External links
 
 

1980 births
Living people
Belgian female judoka
Olympic judoka of Belgium
Judoka at the 2000 Summer Olympics
Olympic bronze medalists for Belgium
Olympic medalists in judo
People from Tongeren
Sportspeople from Limburg (Belgium)
Medalists at the 2000 Summer Olympics
21st-century Belgian women